Morgan County is a county located in the U.S. state of Illinois. According to the 2010 census, it had a population of 35,547. Its county seat is Jacksonville.

Morgan County is part of the Jacksonville, IL Micropolitan Statistical Area, which is also included in the Springfield-Jacksonville-Lincoln, IL Combined Statistical Area.

History
Morgan County was formed in 1823 out of Greene and Sangamon Counties. It was named in honor of General Daniel Morgan, who defeated the British at the Battle of Cowpens in the American Revolutionary War. General Morgan was serving under General Nathanael Greene at Cowpens.  Jacksonville was established by European Americans on a 160-acre tract of land in the center of Morgan County in 1825, two years after the county was founded.  The founders of Jacksonville, Illinois consisted entirely of settlers from New England.  These people were "Yankee" settlers, that is to say they were descended from the English Puritans who settled New England in the 1600s.  They were part of a wave of New England farmers who headed west into what was then the wilds of the Northwest Territory during the early 1800s.  Most of them arrived as a result of the completion of the Erie Canal and the end of the Black Hawk War.  The Yankee migration to Illinois was a result of several factors, one of which was the overpopulation of New England. The old stock Yankee population had large families, often bearing up to ten children in one household. Most people were expected to have their own piece of land to farm, and due to the massive and nonstop population boom, land in New England became scarce as every son claimed his own farmstead. As a result, there was not enough land for every family to have a self-sustaining farm, and Yankee settlers began leaving New England for the Midwestern United States.  When they arrived in what is now Jacksonville there was nothing but dense virgin forest and wild prairie, the "Yankee" New Englanders laid out farms, constructed roads, erected government buildings and established post routes.  They brought with them many of their Yankee New England values, such as a passion for education, establishing many schools as well as staunch support for abolitionism.  They were mostly members of the Congregationalist Church though some were Episcopalian.  Due to the second Great Awakening some of them had converted to Methodism and Presbyterianism while some others became Baptist, before moving to what is now Jacksonville.  Jacksonville, like some other parts of Illinois, would be culturally very continuous with early New England culture for most of its early history.

Geography

The 90th Meridian of Longitude goes through Morgan County, as seen on a road sign at mile 78 of I-72.

Climate and weather

Major highways

  Interstate 72
  U.S. Route 36
  U.S. Route 67
  Illinois Route 123
  Illinois Route 78
  Illinois Route 100
  Illinois Route 104
  Illinois Route 267

Adjacent counties

 Cass County - north
 Sangamon County - east
 Macoupin County - southeast
 Greene County - south
 Pike County - west
 Scott County - southwest
 Brown County - northwest

National protected area
 Meredosia National Wildlife Refuge (part)

Demographics

As of the 2010 United States Census, there were 35,547 people, 14,104 households, and 8,851 families residing in the county. The racial makeup of the county was 90.9% white, 6.0% black or African American, 0.5% Asian, 0.2% American Indian, 0.8% from other races, and 1.6% from two or more races. Those of Hispanic or Latino origin made up 2.0% of the population. In terms of ancestry, 25.9% were German, 21.6% were American, 15.4% were Irish, and 14.5% were English. Those citing "American" ancestry in Morgan County, Illinois are of overwhelmingly English extraction, in many cases going back to colonial New England, however most English Americans identify simply as having "American" ancestry because their roots have been in North America for so long, in many cases since the early sixteen hundreds.

Of the 14,104 households, 28.3% had children under the age of 18 living with them, 47.4% were married couples living together, 11.2% had a female householder with no husband present, 37.2% were non-families, and 31.5% of all households were made up of individuals. The average household size was 2.30 and the average family size was 2.86. The median age was 40.8 years.

The median income for a household in the county was $44,645 and the median income for a family was $59,185. Males had a median income of $43,609 versus $29,893 for females. The per capita income for the county was $23,244. About 11.2% of families and 16.4% of the population were below the poverty line, including 25.8% of those under age 18 and 7.5% of those age 65 or over.

Communities

Cities
 Jacksonville (seat)
 Waverly

Villages

 Chapin
 Concord
 Franklin
 Lynnville
 Meredosia
 Murrayville
 South Jacksonville
 Woodson

Unincorporated communities

 Alexander
 Arcadia
 Arnold
 Literberry
 Markham
 Pisgah

Politics
Morgan County has been reliably Republican from its beginning; the Democratic nominee has gained a plurality only 19% of the time (6 of 32 elections).

Education
Here is a list of school districts with any territory in the county (all are full K-12 school districts), no matter how slight, even if the schools and/or administrative offices are located in other counties:
 A-C Central Community Unit School District 262
 Community Unit School District 16
 Franklin Community Unit School District 1
 Greenfield Community Unit School District 10
 Jacksonville School District 117
 Meredosia-Chambersburg Community Unit School District 11
 Pleasant Plains Community Unit School District 8
 Scott-Morgan Consolidated Unit School District 2
 Triopia Community Unit School District 27
 Virginia Community Unit School District 64
 Waverly Community Unit School District 6
 Winchester Community Unit School District 1

Additionally the following state-operated schools are in Morgan County:
 Illinois School for the Deaf
 Illinois School for the Visually Impaired (School for the Blind)

Private schools:
 Routt Catholic High School

Tertiary:
 Illinois College
 Lincoln Land Community College Jacksonville Outreach Center
 MacMurray College (closed)

See also
 National Register of Historic Places listings in Morgan County, Illinois

References

External links
 

 
Illinois counties
1823 establishments in Illinois
Jacksonville, Illinois micropolitan area
Populated places established in 1823